The 1944 United States Senate election in Illinois was held on November 7, 1944 to elect one of Illinois's members to the United States Senate. Incumbent Democratic U.S. Senator Scott W. Lucas won reelection to a second term.

The race between Lucas and Republican Richard J. Lyons was a rematch of their 1938 United States Senate race six years prior.

Election information
The primaries and general election coincided with those for federal offices (President and House) and state elections.

Primaries were held on April 11.

Democratic primary

Republican primary

General election

See also 
 1944 United States Senate elections

References 

Illinois
United States Senate
United States Senate elections in Illinois